

Overview 

The Leinster Schools Rugby Senior League is a rugby union competition for secondary schools affiliated to the Leinster Branch of the IRFU. It is played before Christmas, after which the Leinster Schools Rugby Senior Cup is played. It is a 12 school competition played by the strongest schools outside of the "Big Six”. The so-called "Big Six" of Leinster schools rugby (Blackrock College, Clongowes Wood College, St Mary's College, Dublin, Terenure College, Belvedere College and St Michael's College, Dublin) do not participate in the competition, although St Michael's College, Dublin used to participate in the competition winning it in 1998.   For the most part it is participated in by mostly private schools but 4 public schools participate in it as well. Schools in the league often provide the biggest form of competition to the "Big Six" in the Leinster Schools Rugby Senior Cup. Schools that participated in the league, outside of the "Big Six" that has gone to win the Leinster Schools Rugby Senior Cup: Cistercian College, Roscrea (2015) against Belvedere College, Newbridge College (2020, shared with Clongowes Wood College due to COVID-19 pandemic) and Gonzaga College (2023) against Blackrock College.

Winners

School with the most Titles: Gonzaga College (7 titles)
Most straight titles in a row: St. Gerard's School, 3 titles in a row.

References

3

https://www.leinsterrugby.ie/gonzaga-claim-schools-senior-league/